Scenic Eclipse  is a passenger ship operated by the Scenic Group. As of August 2020, she is the first ocean going vessel and flagship for the Scenic Group. The vessel was built at the Uljanik shipyard in Pula, Croatia.

During the COVID-19 pandemic, Scenic Eclipse was in 'warm lay-up status' in the Port of Rijeka from May 2020 until June 2021 when it sailed to Saudi Arabia. The ship resumed scheduled passenger operations in January 2022.

History 

Scenic Group founder and Chairman Glen Moroney decided to build Scenic Eclipse after being inspired by Paul Allen's Octopus yacht. The construction of the Scenic Eclipse began in 2017 but was delayed numerous times due to the bankruptcy of the building yard. The vessel finally entered service in August 2019. Scenic Eclipse has a gross tonnage of 17,545.

Scenic Eclipse departed her building yard for the first time on July 27, 2019 for Valletta, Malta, where the vessel was registered, She then sailed to Reykjavik, Iceland where she embarked her first guests on August 15, 2019 with the maiden voyage ending in Quebec on August 27, 2019. Scenic Eclipse was formally named by the actress Helen Mirren in New York City on  September 10, 2019.

Operation 
Scenic Eclipse carries up to 228 passengers, although this is limited to 200 in the Polar Regions where an extensive team of expedition staff are embarked to provide lectures, guiding and to operate the vessel's Zodiac Nautic boats. The vessel comprises all suite accommodation with every cabin featuring a balcony.

Scenic Eclipse is equipped with two Eurocopter EC130 Helicopters  and also carries a seven person crewed submersible called Scenic Neptune built by U-Boat Worx which is capable of diving to depths of up to 300 meters.

Itinerary 
The vessel is designed and built according to Polar Code Rules and carries a Polar Class 6 notation for operation in Polar Regions  While the vessel spends a significant part of the year in the Polar Regions, it also operates regular voyages in the Americas, Europe, Caribbean and South America

References

Notes 

Ships built in Croatia
Cruise ships
2018 ships